Ying Fan Reinfelder is a Chinese–American earth scientist who is a professor and researcher in the Rutgers University Institute of Earth, Ocean, and Atmospheric Sciences. She is interested in climate dynamics and the global water cycle. She was named a Fellow of the American Geophysical Union in 2022.

Early life and education 
Reinfelder was an undergraduate student at the Beijing University of Civil Engineering and Architecture. She moved to the United States for graduate studies, earning a master's degree in geography at the University of Utah. She was a doctoral researcher at Utah State University. Her doctoral research involved numerical investigations into groundwater flow in desert basins. Her research considered density driven ground water flow in desert basins. After earning her doctorate, Reinfelder joined Massachusetts Institute of Technology as a postdoctoral researcher. She also completed a postdoctoral fellowship at Princeton University.

Research and career 
Reinfelder is a professor in the Rutgers University Department of Earth and Planetary Sciences. Her research considers hydrology, and how water impacts the function and structure of planet Earth.

In 2017, Reinfelder demonstrated that soil hydrology influenced global patterns of plant root depths.

Awards and honors 
 2022 Elected Fellow of the American Geophysical Union
 2022 Elected Fellow of the American Association for the Advancement of Science

Selected publications

References

Living people
Beijing University of Civil Engineering and Architecture alumni
University of Utah alumni
Utah State University alumni
Rutgers University faculty
Chinese emigrants to the United States
Fellows of the American Geophysical Union
Earth scientists
American women scientists
Year of birth missing (living people)